Bob 'Bluestone' Flanigan (25 March 1914 – 12 July 1988) was an Australian rules footballer who played for Footscray and Essendon in the Victorian Football League (VFL). His surname has also been spelt Flanagan and Flanegan on some sources.

A left footed half back, Flanigan was renowned for his toughness and once fractured his skull while at Footscray. He polled well for Footscray in the 1937 Brownlow Medal where he was their second largest vote getter.

In 1941, his first season with Essendon, Flanigan was a losing Grand Finalist but the following year he played as a half back flanker in their premiership team.

References

Holmesby, Russell and Main, Jim (2007). The Encyclopedia of AFL Footballers. 7th ed. Melbourne: Bas Publishing.

1914 births
1988 deaths
Essendon Football Club players
Essendon Football Club Premiership players
Western Bulldogs players
Australian rules footballers from Victoria (Australia)
One-time VFL/AFL Premiership players